Anatoliy Sazonovich Koroteyev (born July 22, 1936) is a Soviet and Russian theoretical physicist and academic who contributed to the field of rocket engine physics.

Biography 
Koroteyev was born in Baranovo, Moscow Oblast. In 1959, he graduated from S. Ordzhonikidze Moscow Aviation Institute.

Anatoliy Koroteev is an expert in propulsion and power systems of space-rocket complexes, generation and application of low-temperature plasma, and obtaining powerful energy flow.

With his direct participation and leadership made major research and development:

 Obtained fundamental results, will create the world's first high-power plasma torches;
 Proposed and implemented a unique system of high-power electron and neutral beams in the atmosphere and gases high blood pressure, which was the basis for the development of innovative systems for defense and economic purposes, the complex of space experiments on the interaction of artificial plasma formations with the ionosphere;
 A complex of research on the development of nuclear power plants and ensure their high ground tests;
 Work began on a new generation of high-power electric propulsion and high specific impulse with a new way to control the thrust vector.

He is
 President of the Russian Academy of Cosmonautics, 
 Member of the International Academy of Astronautics 
 Member of the board of Rosaviakosmos,
 Member of the Russian Academy of Sciences.

In 2012, Koroteyev announced that a nuclear reactor for space would be developed at the Keldysh Research Centre and tested at Sosnovy Bor.

Koroteyev has created more than 220 inventions and concepts in the fields of rocket engines and power in space.

Nuclear propulsion advocacy 

Koroteyev is a proponent of nuclear propulsion. He believes that nuclear propulsion can provide the energy needed for a Mars mission.

References

External links 
 Academician Anatoly Koroteyev - 70! on site of Russian Academy of Sciences
 Profile on site of Russian Academy of Sciences

1936 births
Living people
Full Members of the USSR Academy of Sciences
Full Members of the Russian Academy of Sciences
Moscow Aviation Institute alumni
Recipients of the USSR State Prize
Soviet physicists
20th-century Russian  physicists
21st-century Russian physicists
Theoretical physicists